The Middle River of Pictou is a Canadian river located in Pictou County, Nova Scotia.

It rises at Dryden Lake in the community of Glengarry Station. It discharges into Pictou Harbour which is a sub-basin of the Northumberland Strait.

The valley is tied to Nova Scotia's, and Canada's, earliest industrial activity since the discovery in 1798 of what is now known as the Pictou Coalfield in the Carboniferous Stellarton Basin.  Large-scale underground coal mining commenced in the nearby East River of Pictou river valley in 1827 under the General Mining Association and lasted until the explosion at the Westray Mine in 1992; small scale open pit mining has continued since 1992.

The community of "Acadia Mine" which was later renamed as the town of Westville experienced coal mining from the 1860s-1970s, entirely within the watershed of the Middle River of Pictou. Historically, two coal mining companies operated coal shipment piers on the Middle River of Pictou until the early to mid-20th century. One pier was located near the head of navigation in the southern part of Granton along the east bank of the river.  The other pier was located at the mouth of the river at Abercrombie Point in the northern part of Abercrombie. Both piers were served by railway lines and hauled coal from mines in Westville.

The river experienced significant changes in the late 1960s due to industrial development and construction of transportation infrastructure. In 1965 the Government of Nova Scotia  under the leadership of Premier Robert Stanfield passed the Scott Maritimes Limited Agreement (1965) Act in the Nova Scotia House of Assembly. The rail line was realigned to cross the Middle River of Pictou on the reservoir's dam and remained in operation until freight rail traffic ceased in 1986.

The other major change to the Middle River of Pictou, as well as the West River of Pictou and the western portion of Pictou Harbour was the construction in 1968 of a rock fill causeway and tidal sluice gates across the harbour between Abercrombie Point in the south and Brown's Point in the north. This causeway carries Nova Scotia Highway 106 and is named the "Harvey A. Veniot Causeway" in honour of local politician Harvey Veniot. The causeway has proven controversial as in addition to limiting the exchange of water in the harbour, it has significantly reduced the navigable portion of Pictou Harbour.

The majority of the watershed of the Middle River of Pictou is heavily forested.

Communities
(from source to mouth)

 Glengarry Station
 Concord
 Rocklin
 Union Centre
 Pleasant Valley
 Hamilton Road
 Westville
 Alma
 Sylvester
 Granton
 Loch Broom
 Abercrombie

See also
List of rivers of Nova Scotia

References

Rivers of Nova Scotia
Landforms of Pictou County